Velvet Fingers is a 1920 American adventure film serial directed by George B. Seitz. Although the film is listed as lost by some sources, a copy is available in the archives of the Cinémathèque Française.

Cast
 George B. Seitz as Velvet Fingers
 Marguerite Courtot as Lorna George
 Harry Semels as Professor Robin
 Lucille Lennox as Clara
 Frank Redman as Pinky
 Thomas Carr as Mickey (credited as Tommy Carr)
 Joe Cuny as Needless Smith
 Al Franklin Thomas
 Edward Elkas

Chapter titles
To Catch a Thief
The Face Behind the Curtain
The Hand from Behind the Door
The Man in the Blue Spectacles
The Deserted Pavilion
Unmasked
The House of a Thousand Veils
Aiming Straight
The Broken Necklace
Shots in the Dark
The Other Woman
Into Ambush
The Hidden Room
The Trap
Out of the Web

See also
 List of film serials
 List of film serials by studio

References

External links

1920 films
1920s crime thriller films
1920 adventure films
American silent serial films
American crime thriller films
American black-and-white films
Films directed by George B. Seitz
American adventure films
1920s American films
Silent adventure films
1920s English-language films
Silent crime films